Dichopetala catinata, the spoon-tailed short-wing katydid, is a species of phaneropterine katydid in the family Tettigoniidae. It is found in North America.

References

Further reading

 
 
 

Phaneropterinae
Articles created by Qbugbot
Insects described in 1914